A Night Before Christmas is the thirtieth album (and first Christmas album) by Spyro Gyra, recorded and released in 2008. 

Janis Siegel of the Manhattan Transfer sings on "Baby, It's Cold Outside". The album peaked at No. 14 on the Holiday Albums chart at Billboard magazine.

Track listing

Personnel 

Spyro Gyra
 Jay Beckenstein – saxophones
 Tom Schuman – pianos
 Julio Fernandez  – guitars
 Scott Ambush – bass guitar, double bass
 Bonny Bonnaparte – drums, vocals (5, 11)

Additional musicians
 Dave Samuels – vibraphone (3, 6)
 Christine Ebersole – vocals (2)
 Janis Siegel – vocals (5)

Production 
 Jay Beckenstein – producer
 Dave Love – executive producer 
 Robert Harari – engineer 
 Kieran Paradis – engineer
 Mark Urselli – engineer
 Doug Oberkircher – mixing 
 Natalie Singer – product manager 
 Robert Hoffman – art direction, design

References 

Spyro Gyra albums
2008 Christmas albums
Christmas albums by American artists
Jazz Christmas albums
Heads Up International albums